Buca Belediyesi is a proposed underground station on the Üçyol—Çamlıkule Line of the İzmir Metro. It will be located beneath Menderes Avenue Buca. Construction of the station, along with the metro line, is expected to begin in 2020. The station will located in front of the Buca Tax Administration and one block west of the Buca Municipality building.

Buca Belediyesi station is expected to open in 2024.

References

İzmir Metro
Railway stations scheduled to open in 2024
Rapid transit stations under construction in Turkey